The Grosse Melchaa (also Melchaa) is a 18.5 km long affluent of the Lake Sarnen in the Canton Obwalden, Switzerland.

References

External links 

Reuss basin
Rivers of Obwalden
Kerns, Switzerland